The Darla Moore School of Business is the official business school of the University of South Carolina. Founded in 1919, the Moore School is located in Columbia, South Carolina and currently enrolls over 5,500 undergraduate and 800 graduate students in degree-seeking programs, including bachelor's, master's and doctorate degrees. The school is well known for its consistent high rankings in its program for international business.

History
The University of South Carolina (USC) began efforts to open a school of commerce as early as 1914. USC founded the school in 1919 and dean George Olson firmly established the school by the early 1920s. The school grew with the university, and by 1958, the school established the Master of Business Administration program. By 1963, AACSB gave the school full accreditation.

The Professional Master of Business Administration (then called MBA-ETV) started in 1970. The Professional MBA program allows people in South Carolina to receive an MBA by taking part-time classes at remote locations and over the internet. Then in 1974 the school established its Master of International Business (MIBS). National publications hold the program in high esteem and the program continuously garners high rankings in international business.

In 1998, Wall Street financier and USC graduate Darla Moore donated $25 million to the business school. In her honor the school was renamed Darla Moore School of Business, although sometimes shortened to the Moore School.

The school combined its MIBS and MBA programs to form the International MBA program in 2002. The same year, the school started offering a specialization in international business for undergraduate students as a major.

On April 23, 2004 the Moore School announced another gift by Darla Moore. She donated $45 million with the challenge to the university to match that sum.

On September 22, 2011, the University of South Carolina broke ground on the new Darla Moore School of Business on Assembly Street next to the Carolina Coliseum.  The new Darla Moore School of Business includes 35 classrooms and 136 offices for university faculty.

Facilities

In August 2014, the Moore School took occupancy of its new home located at the corner of Assembly and Greene streets in downtown Columbia, SC. The building has created buzz not only for its iconic design by Rafael Viñoly Architects of New York, but also for its green features.

The building's cantilevered and glass design maximize natural light within and, with its open interior, encourage openness and collaboration. The main level houses a visitors' center, a cafe, a trading room, and an expansive, open-air courtyard.

The third and fourth levels will provide views below of the Palmetto Court, a green space that features groupings of sable palms, and the Pavilion, which will be used for lectures and special events.

The new school was designed with interaction and collaboration in mind. Every level will have open spaces with flexible furnishings, outlets for technology and white boards that students, faculty, staff and others can use and adapt for meetings or team projects. Even the large open stairwells are designed to encourage interaction.

The first floor is the learning level. It will feature a variety of classrooms, all designed with technology and flexibility for student collaboration in mind. It also will feature a 500-seat lecture and performance hall, the result of a partnership with, and support from, the School of Music. The cafe will have extended hours for serving visitors who attend events in the hall.

The third floor will feature executive education, classrooms outfitted with advanced telepresence technology, administrative offices and a conference center with meeting spaces. Faculty offices and a research lab are located on the fourth floor.

The roof, which will feature green turf to reduce heat and improve energy efficiency, is one of the myriad sustainable features of the building. Its design will maximize natural light and shade for cooling. Occupants will benefit from outdoor views and light, pristine air quality and control of heating, air and lighting in their own spaces.

The building's design incorporates goals for earning a LEED Platinum and a Net-Zero rating, meaning that it will generate as much energy as it consumes. The Moore School was selected by the U.S. Energy Department to partner with its national laboratories in its Net-Zero Energy Commercial Building Partnership program. As a result of the partnership, the Moore School has benefitted from expertise in energy technologies and building systems and design and operating practices.

Academics

Rank and reputation

U.S. News & World Report in its 2021 annual survey "America’s Best Colleges Guide" ranked the Moore School's undergraduate international business degree first in the United States. In the specialty of international business, the publication ranked the school No. 1 in the United States, a position the school has held for twenty-two years.

On the national level, in the latest ranking of graduate programs by U.S. News & World Report, the Moore School continued as the #1 American university in the international business category. The publication ranked the school #62 in the US in overall graduate business education. The Wall Street Journal ranked the Moore School 49th out of 51 national business schools in a "Regional Ranking" in the September 20, 2007 edition of the Journal. In the 2010 QS Global 200 Business Schools Report, the Darla Moore School of Business was placed 28th in North America. In the 2010 Public Accounting Report, the Masters of Accounting program was ranked 25th in the country.

Programs

Undergraduate
After four years of study, undergraduate students finish their careers at the Darla Moore School of Business with a Bachelor of Science in Business Administration degree.  The program consist of 121 credit hours and combines a strong liberal arts background with practical business education.  The core curriculum that every student studies includes marketing, management, finance and management science. After the core, usually in their junior year, students can choose a major or majors from the following areas: accounting, finance (corporate, investments, or financial services track), insurance and risk management, international business, management (entrepreneurship or human resources track), economics, marketing, management science (business information systems or global supply chain and operations management track), and real estate.

The Undergraduate International Business major at the Moore School solidifies its international business rankings.

Graduate

MBA programs
International MBA

The International Masters of Business Administration at the Darla Moore School of Business combines traditional business education with intensive language training in one of eight languages – Arabic, Chinese, French, German, Italian, Japanese, Portuguese, or Spanish.  In addition to the language tracks, the global track allows students to study the business and cultural issues of regions around the world without learning a language other than English.  All tracks are 20–22 months, with the exception of Arabic, Chinese, and Japanese, which require 29–34 months of study to give students added exposure to the more complex languages and cultures of these countries.  Students may also volunteer with the Peace Corps during the IMBA program, extending the program length to approximately 48 months.  Students must be accepted separately to the Peace Corps' Masters' International Program.

Students begin the program with an intensive core of business courses. The core lasts from July to December. In January, students begin language training in the country that natively speaks the language they are learning.  Then around April 1, students begin a mandatory internship, ideally in the language they studied.

After their internships are completed, students in both the language and global tracks return to the Moore School to continue their business education. Students take elective classes during their final two semesters either at USC or they may choose to complete a one-semester exchange.

Professional MBA

The Moore School designed the Professional MBA program as a part-time, 28-month MBA program for working professionals. Students have the options of taking classes in 20 locations throughout SC and one location in Charlotte, NC. Some classes are also broadcast over South Carolina's public television system, ETV. Although the program is over 36 years old, email and the internet are critical tools for students. The professors that teach in the program are the same professors who teach full-time students.

Other programs
Master of Accountancy

The Master of Accountancy program is designed for students who have an undergraduate degree in accounting from an accredited university. The additional education provides the opportunity to specialize in a particular field of accounting, complete the professional examinations while in school, and meet the specific educational requirements to qualify for the CPA designation in some states. Although this program is a natural extension of study for students who have completed an undergraduate degree in accounting, it is open to anyone who satisfies the school's admission standards regardless of their undergraduate major.

Master of Arts in Economics

The Master of Arts in Economics program is designed to prepare a student for a career as a professional economist in government or business.  The program also serves as an avenue toward further graduate work in the field of economics.  Graduate course offerings in economics include business economics, human capital and manpower economics, quantitative economics, public finance, money and banking, economic history, economic theory,  developmental economics, international economics, and industrial organization and public policy.

Masters of Human Resources

The MHR Program consists of 36 hours of course work plus a required six-hour internship.  All internships are professional level, last at least eight weeks (most last 12 or more) and provide on-the-job experience in an actual human resources environment. Limited enrollment (approximately 30-35 new students per year) and small class size provide students with individualized attention.

Master of International Business

The Master of International Business Program is an interdisciplinary program that combines the development of international business expertise with an advanced understanding of international studies. The program is unique in its focus on political, economic, and socio-cultural dimensions of global business. The curriculum is designed to provide a broadened and integrative understanding of business and government interactions globally.

Doctoral
For those students who wish to enter academia, the Moore School offers two basic doctoral programs: Ph.D. in Business Administration and Ph.D. in Economics.  These programs have a large amount of flexibility to suit the needs of each students.  Graduates currently hold positions at University of Memphis, Cambridge University, Indiana University, University of Houston–Clear Lake, College of Charleston, University of North Carolina at Charlotte, Furman University, East Carolina University, the Federal Reserve Bank of New York, the Environmental Protection Agency, the Central Intelligence Agency, the International Monetary Fund, BellSouth, and Bank of America.

Student organizations
Alpha Kappa Psi
American Marketing Association
Association of Supply Chain Students (ASCS)
Beta Alpha Psi
Beta Gamma Sigma
Business Student Council
Carolina Finance Club
Delta Sigma Pi
Finance Scholars
Financial Management Association
Gamma Iota Sigma
Marketing Scholars
Sigma Omega Upsilon- International Business Fraternity
Society for Human Resource Management (SHRM)
Global Business Council
National Association of Black Accountants
Carolina Investment Association
Phi Chi Theta Business Professional Fraternity

See also
List of United States business school rankings
List of business schools in the United States

References

External links
Moore School of Business Official Website
Overview from AACSB

Business schools in South Carolina
University of South Carolina
Educational institutions established in 1919
1919 establishments in South Carolina